Tomasz Jodłowiec (born 8 September 1985) is a Polish professional footballer who plays as a defensive midfielder for Podbeskidzie Bielsko-Biała.

Club career
Jodłowiec was born in Żywiec. He debuted in the Ekstraklasa in July 2006 for Dyskobolia Grodzisk Wielkopolski. In 2008, he moved to the Polish capital after Dyskobolia merged with Polonia Warsaw. Jodłowiec was closely monitored by Serie A club Napoli FC in January 2009 but turned down a transfer for family reasons. On 19 February 2013 Tomasz signed a three-year contract with Legia Warsaw.

International career

Jodłowiec debuted for the Poland national team on 11 October 2008, coming on as a substitute for Rafal Murawski during the 2010 World Cup qualifier against the Czech Republic. On 14 December he played his first entire match against Serbia. Jodłowiec scored an own goal during an international friendly with France on 9 June 2011.

He appeared at Euro 2016, playing in all of Poland games, mostly as a substitute - coming on in late minutes to boost the team's defense.

Career statistics

Club

International

Scores and results list Poland's goal tally first, score column indicates score after each Jodłowiec goal.

Honours
Dyskobolia Grodzisk Wielkopolski
 Polish Cup: 2006–07
 Ekstraklasa Cup: 2006–07, 2007-08

Śląsk Wrocław
 Polish Super Cup: 2012

Legia Warsaw
 Ekstraklasa: 2012–13, 2013–14, 2015–16, 2016–17, 2017–18, 2019–20
 Polish Cup: 2012–13, 2014–15, 2015–16, 2017–18

Piast Gliwice
Ekstraklasa: 2018–19

References

External links

 
 National team stats on the website of the Polish Football Association 
 

1985 births
Living people
People from Żywiec
Sportspeople from Silesian Voivodeship
Polish footballers
Association football defenders
Association football midfielders
Poland international footballers
UEFA Euro 2016 players
Ekstraklasa players
I liga players
III liga players
Widzew Łódź players
ŁKS Łódź players
Dyskobolia Grodzisk Wielkopolski players
Polonia Warsaw players
Śląsk Wrocław players
Legia Warsaw players
Legia Warsaw II players
Piast Gliwice players
Podbeskidzie Bielsko-Biała players